Howard Albert Hoffman (December 4, 1921 – October 22, 1996) was an American professional basketball player. He played in the National Basketball League for the Oshkosh All-Stars and Anderson Duffey Packers and averaged 5.1 points per game. Hoffman also served in World War II and served as a farmer until his retirement.

References

1921 births
1996 deaths
United States Army personnel of World War II
American men's basketball players
Anderson Packers players
Basketball players from Indianapolis
Farmers from Indiana
Forwards (basketball)
Guards (basketball)
Military personnel from Indiana
Oshkosh All-Stars players
Purdue Boilermakers men's basketball players